Kurtzweil may refer to:
Alvin Kurtzweil, a character in The X-Files (film)
A misspelling of the surname Kurzweil